Lesnoy is a rural locality (a settlement) in Pavnovsky Selsoviet, Rebrikhinsky District, Altai Krai, Russia. The population was 36 as of 2013. There is 1 street.

Geography 
Lesnoy is located 11 km southwest of Rebrikha (the district's administrative centre) by road. Rebrikha is the nearest rural locality.

References 

Rural localities in Rebrikhinsky District